Kalyanam Kamaneeyam may refer to:

Kalyanam Kamaneeyam (film), a 2023 Indian Telugu-language film
Kalyanam Kamaneeyam (TV series), an Indian Telugu-language television series